Collinson is a surname. Notable people with the surname include:

 Cliff Collinson (1920–1990), English footballer
 Fred Collinson (1874–1915), English footballer and soldier
 Geoff Collinson, Australian horn player and Head of Brass at the University of Melbourne
 Harry Collinson Owen (1882–1956), British journalist and author
 James Collinson (1825–1881), Victorian painter who was a member of the Pre-Raphaelite Brotherhood 
 John Collinson (cricketer) (1911–1979), English cricketer 
 John Collinson (historian) (c.1757–1793), English cleric and historian of Somerset
 Laurence Collinson (1925–1986), British and Australian playwright, actor, poet, journalist, and secondary school teacher
 Les Collinson (born 1935), English professional footballer
 Madeleine Collinson (1952–2014), Maltese-British model and actress; twin of Mary Collinson
 Mary Collinson (born 1952), Maltese model and actress; twin of Madeleine Collinson
 Patrick Collinson (1929–2011), English historian
 Peter Collinson (botanist) (1694–1768), Enghlish gardener, botanist and horticulturist
 Peter Collinson (film director) (1936–1980), British film director 
 Phil Collinson (born 1970), British television producer
 Richard Collinson (1811–1883), English naval officer and explorer of the Arctic
 Robert Collinson (1875–1963), English cricketer
 Septimus Collinson (1739–1827), provost of Queen's College, Oxford
 William Edward Collinson (1889–1969), British linguist
 William Robert Collinson (1912–1995), American federal judge

See also
 Cape Collinson, also Hak Kok Tau (黑角頭), cape located near Ngan Wan between Siu Sai Wan and Big Wave Bay in the east most point of the Hong Kong Island in Hong Kong
 Collinson Peninsula, Nunavut, Canada
 Collinson Ridge, Antarctica
 Fort Collinson, Northwest Territories, Canada
 Collinson Point Provincial Park, on Galiano Island, British Columbia, Canada

English-language surnames
Patronymic surnames
Surnames from given names